Reinette Joanne Klever (born 21 July 1967) is a Dutch politician and former asset manager. She was a member of the House of Representatives for the Party for Freedom between 20 September 2012 and 23 March 2017. She was a member of the Senate from 7 June 2011 to 20 September 2012.

Klever lives in Ermelo.

References 

1967 births
21st-century Dutch politicians
21st-century Dutch women politicians
Living people
Members of the House of Representatives (Netherlands)
Members of the Senate (Netherlands)
Party for Freedom politicians
People from Ermelo, Netherlands
People from Weesp